Pate is a surname. Notable people with the surname include:

Alan Pate (born 1963), American golfer
Archie Pate (1886–1936), American Negro league baseball player
Ashby Pate (born 1978), American lawyer and former associate justice of Palau
Bertha Lee Pate (1902–1975), American blues singer
Bob Pate (born 1953), American baseball player
Bobby Pate (born ?), American football player and coach
Brooks Pate (born ?), American professor of chemistry
Christine Pomponio-Pate (born 1975), American competitive fitness model and actress
Danny Pate (born 1979), American bicycle racer
David Pate (born 1962), American tennis player
Henry Clay Pate (1833–1864), soldier defeated in Kansas by John Brown
James Leonard Pate (1935–2003), American oil executive, economist, and author
Janez Pate (born 1965), Slovenian football player and manager
Jerry Pate (born 1953), American golfer
Joe Pate (1892–1948), American baseball player
John Pate (born ?), American football coach
Johnny Pate (born 1923), American jazz bass guitarist, music arranger, and record producer
Jonas Pate (born 1970), American screenwriter, director, and producer (twin brother of Josh)
Josh Pate (born 1970), American screenwriter, director, and producer (twin brother of Jonas)
Kimberly Pate (a disambiguation page)
Klytie Pate (1912–2010) Australian potter, ceramicist, and artist
Lloyd Pate (born 1946), American football player
Louis M. Pate Jr. (born 1936), American politician
Martha Lucas Pate (1912–1983), American educator, administrator, philanthropist
Maurice Pate (1894–1965), American humanitarian and businessman
Michael Pate (1920–2008), Australian actor, writer, director, and WWII Army veteran
Miguel Pate (born 1979), American track and field athlete, and Olympic competitor
Muhammad Ali Pate (born 1968), Nigerian civil servant and public health doctor
Nick Pate, American professional ten-pin bowler
Paul Pate (born 1958), American businessman and politician
Randolph M. Pate (1898–1961), US Marine Commandant
Richard Pate (1516–1588), English landowner, politician, and founder of Pate's Grammar School
Richard Pate (bishop) (Pates, Patys, died 1565), English bishop
Rick Pate (born 1955), American politician
Robert Pate (1819–1895), British army officer known for his assault of Queen Victoria in 1850
Rupert Pate (1917–2014), American football player
Sandy Pate (born 1944), Scottish footballer
Stephen Pate (born 1964), Australian cyclist and Olympic competitor
Steve Pate (born 1961), American golfer
Tom Pate (1952–1975), American linebacker for the Canadian Football League
Walter Pate (1874-1950), American politician